Frank Naylor was a football player in the United States Football League for the New Jersey Generals.  He played at the collegiate level at Rutgers University.

Early years
Naylor was born Frank John Naylor on January 25, 1959, in Philadelphia, Pennsylvania.

College career
He played center at Rutgers University and graduated with a degree in communications. In 1981, his senior year, he was named AP All-East and was selected as the team MVP.

NFL

Seattle Seahawks 
The Seattle Seahawks drafted Naylor in the twelfth round of the 1982 NFL Draft. The Seahawks later released him on August 17, 1982.

USFL

New Jersey Generals
Naylor signed with the New Jersey Generals of the United States Football League on November 24, 1982, and played in 17 games during their 1983 Inaugural Season. He returned in 1984 and played in 18 regular season games and in the playoff loss to the Philadelphia Stars. In 1985 Naylor sustained an injury to his left leg during the Generals' training camp in Orlando, Florida and was out for the entire season. 
During his time with the Generals, Naylor would wear jersey number 51.

References 

1959 births
Living people
Rutgers Scarlet Knights football players
New Jersey Generals players